David M. Cornish (born 1972) is an illustrator and fantasy writer from Adelaide, South Australia.

Biography 
Cornish studied illustration at the University of South Australia, where in 1993 he began to compile a series of notebooks: over the next ten years he filled 23 journals with his pictures, definitions, ideas and histories of his world, the "Half-Continent".

It was not until 2003 that a chance encounter with a children's publisher gave him an opportunity to develop these ideas further. Learning of his journals, she urged him to write a story from his world. Cornish was sent away with the task of delivering 1,000 words the following week and each week thereafter. Abandoning all other paid work, he spent the next two years propped up with one small advance after another.

Works 
His first book is Foundling, the first part of the Monster Blood Tattoo trilogy. The second book named Lamplighter was released in May 2008. The third in the series is named Factotum and was released in October 2010. He has stated that he plans to continue writing novels set in the Half-Continent and in March 2014, published a book of short stories titled Tales from the Half-Continent (Monster Blood Tattoo 3.5).

Awards
 2006 Aurealis Award Best Young Adult Novel, winner for Monster Blood Tattoo Book One: Foundling 
 2007 Children's Book Council of Australia Older Readers Book of the Year, Shortlist for Monster Blood Tattoo Book One: Foundling
 2008 Aurealis Award Best Children's (8-12 years) Illustrated Work/Picture Book, finalist for The Sorcerer's Tower series (illustrator)
 2008 Aurealis Award Best Young Adult Novel, finalist for Monster Blood Tattoo Book Two: Lamplighter
 2014 Aurealis Award Best Young Adult Short Story, finalist for The Fuller and the Bogle''' appearing in Tales from the Half Continent''

References

External links

 Official blog
 Miss Erin Interview with Mr. Cornish
 
 

1972 births
Australian fantasy writers
Living people
Writers from Adelaide
University of South Australia alumni
Australian male novelists